Ynyslwyd Chapel, Aberdare was a Baptist chapel in Sunny Bank Place, located between Aberaman and Aberdare. It was formed as a branch of Calfaria, Aberdare.

Early history
Ynyslwyd was established in 1858 as a Sunday school although meetings were previously held in the long room of the Albion Inn, Cardiff Road, Aberaman, Aberaman. As with neighbouring chapels, including Gwawr, Aberaman, evidence suggests there was a closer link between early nonconformist chapels and public houses than has been thought. The chapel was built in 1862 by David Morgan of Treorchy and named Ynyslwyd after the estate which owned the land. The first minister was Thomas Davies.

Later history
In 1935, T.E. Thomas came to Ynyslwyd from Nazareth, Blaenllechau, a church in the Rhondda Valley that Ynyslwyd played a role in its establishment many years before.

The chapel closed in 1996 and was demolished in 1998.

References

Bibliography

Chapels in Rhondda Cynon Taf
Aberdare
Baptist churches in Wales
Demolished buildings and structures in Wales
Buildings and structures demolished in 1998